Froggy the Gremlin was a character created by Smilin' Ed McConnell and brought to radio in the 1940s and television in 1950s on the Smilin' Ed's Gang show, and later Andy's Gang TV show, hosted by actor Andy Devine after McConnell's death.

The character
Froggy was a troublemaker. Disrespectful of adult authority figures, Froggy played practical jokes and disrupted the presentations of other guests. If a guest were to demonstrate how to paint a wall, he might say, "And now I'm going to take this can of paint..." Froggy would chime in, "And dump it over my head." And the confused guest would proceed to do so.

On radio and the early TV shows, Froggy's voice was frequently supplied by Arch ("Archie") Presby, who was also the program's announcer.

He appeared on screen in a puff of smoke with the catchphrase, "Hiya, kids! Hiya hiya hiya hiya!" The human host had another catchphrase, directed to Froggy, "Plunk your magic twanger, Froggy!"

References in popular culture
 Froggy appears on the fictional television series Young People's After-school Press Conference to disrupt an interview with Dr. Henry Kissinger (Roger Bowen) in the 1976 satirical film TunnelVision.
 Buckner & Garcia paid tribute on a 1982 novelty song about the arcade game Frogger called "Froggy's Lament" from their album Pac-Man Fever, which utilized Froggy's catchphrases. 
 Froggy made regular appearances on The Ghoul Show in which he was more often the victim of the host's pranks rather than the initiator of the same.
 George R. R. Martin, a well-known writer of science fiction and fantasy, occasionally uses a picture of Froggy the Gremlin as his avatar when posting on his "Not a Blog". Fans of Martin's A Song of Ice and Fire series have speculated that Martin adopts the Froggy icon when dropping hints as to new developments in the books. In addition Martin has made reference to the character in the Wild Cards series and in The Armageddon Rag.

See also
 Vito Scotti

Further reading
The Search for Smilin' Ed by Kim Deitch, Fantagraphics (2010)
 TVparty! Television's Untold Tales by Billy Ingram, Taylor Trade Publishing (1998)

References

External links
 Froggy the Gremlin fan site
 Froggy the Gremlin at TVparty.com

Fictional frogs